KVJY (840 AM) is a radio station licensed to Pharr, Texas.  The station airs a Spanish Christian format.

In May 2017, Bi-Media, composed of members of the Bichara family which also owns radio holdings in Mexico, sold KVJY to Daij Media. Daij is owned by the Villarreal family and primarily operates Radio Aleluya religious stations. The sale, at a price of $910,000, was consummated on July 18, 2017.

References

External links

News and talk radio stations in the United States
VJY
Radio stations established in 1989
1989 establishments in Texas